The Melbourne Neuropsychiatry Centre (MNC), is a joint centre of University of Melbourne and Melbourne Health in Australia. It brings together clinical and research teams at Sunshine and Royal Melbourne Hospitals, with a dedicated brain imaging archive and analysis laboratory located at the University's Parkville campus.

The MNC was established in 2004 with the appointment of Christos Pantelis as Foundation Professor in Neuropsychiatry at The University of Melbourne. Since that time, MNC has established its reputation as one of the most productive psychiatric research centres in Australia. The team at MNC currently consists of both academic and professional staff. At any given time MNC supports over 30 individuals who work with the research streams at the Alan Gilbert Building as stipend funded PhD students, Masters and Honours students, and international research fellows.

The MNC has established an international reputation in the areas of cognition and neuroimaging in schizophrenia with several important publications in high-profile international psychiatry, neurology and radiology journals. MNC has maintained a core research focus on understanding the neurobiology of psychosis and other neurodevelopment disorders (including autism spectrum disorders), following on from its seminal work identifying progressive changes at transition to a psychotic illness (Pantelis et al., Lancet, 2003). It has also developed core overlapping research interests in the area of epilepsy and neurodegenerative disorders (Velakoulis et al.); depression and anxiety (Harrison et al., Whittle et al.); advanced brain network science (Zalesky et al.) and psychiatric genetics and genomics (Bousman et al.). The MNC aims to ensure that people suffering from neuropsychiatric disorders benefit from cutting edge research that will improve management and treatment outcomes.

External links 
 Melbourne Neuropsychiatry Centre website

Organisations based in Melbourne
Research institutes in Melbourne
University of Melbourne
Mental health organisations in Australia